The Buffalo State Bengals team represents Buffalo State College in college football. The Bengals competes in the NCAA Division III as a member of the Liberty League, which they joined in 2019 after playing in the Empire 8 from 2012 to 2018.

Buffalo State's first football team was fielded in 1980. The team plays its home games at the 3,000 seat Coyer Field, located on-campus in Buffalo, New York. The Bengals are currently coached by Lazarus Morgan.

History

Notable former players
Notable former players include:
T. J. Cottrell: Former National Football League tight end

Year-by-year results
Statistics correct as of the end of the 2017-18 college football season

References

External links
 

 
American football teams established in 1980
1980 establishments in New York (state)